Michels is a surname, derived from Michaels, which in turn is derived from the given name Michael. Notable people with the surname include:

Birgit Michels (born 1984), German badminton player
David Michels, British businessman
Jan Michels, Dutch footballer
Jeff Michels, American weight lifter
Mareno Michels, Dutch darts player
Pete Michels, American television director
Rinus Michels, Dutch association football player and coach
Robert Michels, German sociologist
Robert Michels (physician), physician and professor of Medicine and of Psychiatry

See also
Michels syndrome, a congenital disorder
Surnames from given names